Nazrana is a 1961 Indian black-and-white Hindi-language melodrama film produced by S. Krishnamurthy and T. Govindarajan and directed by C. V. Sridhar in his Hindi directorial debut. The film stars Raj Kapoor, Vyjayanthimala, Usha Kiran in love triangle, while South Star Gemini Ganeshan has an extended cameo appearance. The music is by Ravi. The Mohammed Rafi song "Baazi Kisi Ne Pyar Ki Jeeti Ya Haar Di", which was picturised on Raj Kapoor and it was one of the popular sad songs of that era.

The film was a remake of the 1959 Tamil film Kalyana Parisu, which was also directed by C. V. Sridhar. Nazrana is a triangular love story between Raj, Vasanthi and Geeta.

Plot 
Raj (Raj Kapoor) and Basanti (Vyjayanthimala) are college mates who clash when she complains to the college principal about a love letter he sent her. Later on, realizing her mistake, Basanti apologizes to him and the two fall in love. Basanti's elder sister, Geeta (Usha Kiran), supports the family by stitching clothes. Raj rents the room upstairs in their house. He falls ill and in nursing him, Geeta falls in love with him. She confides her love to Basanti, who decides to sacrifice her love for the sake of her sister and convinces Raj to marry Geeta. Raj initially neglects Geeta. On finding out, Basanti writes to him that their sacrifice, made for Geeta's happiness, would mean nothing unless he is a good husband to Geeta. Raj relents and marries Geeta and they have a son. Basanti joins them and Geeta suspects that there is something on between Raj and Basanti and makes Basanti leave the house. A few years later, Geeta, having found out that Raj and Basanti loved each other, dies in guilt leaving Raj alone to bring up their child, making him promise that he will make Basanti the child's mother. Raj learns of Basanti's impending marriage to her former boss Shyam (Gemini Ganeshan). By the time he reaches there, Basanti is already married. He hands over his child to Basanti as a wedding gift and walks away.

Cast 
Raj Kapoor as Rajesh "Raj"
Vyjayanthimala as Basanti
Usha Kiran as Geeta
Gemini Ganeshan as Shyam
Agha as Murli
Sabita Chatterji as Chanchal
Niranjan Sharma as Shyam's dad
Achala Sachdev as Geeta and Basanti's Mother.
Master Shahid as Raja

Casting 
Initially the shooting of the film was started with actress B. Saroja Devi, who acted in the Tamil original Kalyana Parisu and its Telugu remake Pelli Kanuka. During the filming process, she fell out with the director C. V. Sridhar and was replaced by actress Usha Kiran.

Box office 
At the end of its theatrical run, Nazrana grossed around 90,00,000 with net of 45,00,000 and was an average success at box office, thus becoming 12th highest-grossing film of 1961.

Soundtrack 

The film soundtrack was composed by Ravi, with lyrics by Rajendra Krishan. The songs "Baazi Kisi Ne Pyar Ki Jeeti Ya Haar Di", "Bikhrake Zulfen Chaman Mein Na Jana" and "Ek Woh Bhi Diwali Thi" became popular.

Awards

Filmfare Awards 
1961 – Filmfare Award for Best Story – C. V. Sridhar

References

External links 
 
 Nazrana profile at Upperstall.com

Films scored by Ravi
1961 films
Hindi remakes of Tamil films
1960s Hindi-language films
Indian black-and-white films
Films directed by C. V. Sridhar